The Chichibabin pyridine synthesis is a method for synthesizing pyridine rings. The reaction involves the condensation reaction of aldehydes, ketones, α,β-Unsaturated carbonyl compounds, or any combination of the above, with ammonia. It was reported by Aleksei Chichibabin in 1924. 
Methyl-substituted pyridines, which show widespread uses among multiple fields of applied chemistry, are prepared by this methodology.

Representative syntheses

The syntheses are presently conduced commercially in the presence of oxide catalysts such as modified alumina (Al2O3) or silica]] (SiO2). The reactants are passed over the catalyst at 350-500 °C. 2-Methylpyridine- and 4-methylpyridine are produced as a mixture from acetaldehyde and ammonia. 3-Methylpyridine and pyridine are produced from acrolein and ammonia.  Acrolein and propionaldehyde react with ammonia affords mainly 3-methylpyridine. 5-Ethyl-2-methylpyridine is produced from paraldehyde and ammonia.

Mechanism and optimizations
These syntheses involve many reactions such as imine synthesis, base-catalyzed aldol condensations, and Michael reactions.

Many efforts have been made to improve the method. Conducting the reaction in the gas phase in the presence of aluminium(III) oxide. zeolite (yield 98.9% at 500 K),

From nitriles
Of the many variations have been explored. one approach employs nitriles as the nitrogen source.  For example, acrylonitrile and acetone affords 2-methylpyridine uncontaminated with the 4-methyl derivative.  In another variation, alkynes and nitriles react in the presence of organocobalt catalysts, a reaction inspired by alkyne trimerization.

See also
Chichibabin reaction
Gattermann–Skita synthesis
Hantzsch pyridine synthesis
Ciamician–Dennstedt rearrangement

References

Pyridine forming reactions
Heterocycle forming reactions
Name reactions
Soviet inventions